Vilkhivka is a village in the Novhorod-Siverskyi Raion, Chernihiv Oblast (province) of northern Ukraine.

Demographics
Native language as of the Ukrainian Census of 2001:
 Ukrainian 100%

References

Villages in Novhorod-Siverskyi Raion